Cengiz Koç (born 9 September 1977 in Gronau, North Rhine-Westphalia) is a German heavyweight boxer of Turkish descent who won the bronze medal at the 2000 European amateur championships.  He has also won a European championship in amateur kickboxing.

Amateur
In Houston at the World championships 1999 he lost on points to eventual runner-up Kazakh Mukhtarkhan Dildabekov.
At the European Championships 2000 he scored his biggest result in a third place after losing to Russian Alexei Lezin.
At the Olympics he was spectacularly knocked cold in his first match by Cuban giant Alexis Rubalcaba.

Pro
He turned pro afterwards but disappointed displaying little power and dedication.
He lost to Michael Sprott, Paolo Vidoz and Timo Hoffmann.

Titles

Amateur Boxing
2000 European Amateur Boxing Championships in Tampere, Finland  +91 kg

Amateur Kickboxing
1996 W.A.K.O. European Championships in Belgrade, Yugoslavia  +91 kg (Low-Kick)

Professional boxing record

|-
|align="center" colspan=8|24 Wins (15 knockouts, 9 decisions), 3 Losses (3 decisions) 
|-
| align="center" style="border-style: none none solid solid; background: #e3e3e3"|Result
| align="center" style="border-style: none none solid solid; background: #e3e3e3"|Record
| align="center" style="border-style: none none solid solid; background: #e3e3e3"|Opponent
| align="center" style="border-style: none none solid solid; background: #e3e3e3"|Type
| align="center" style="border-style: none none solid solid; background: #e3e3e3"|Round
| align="center" style="border-style: none none solid solid; background: #e3e3e3"|Date
| align="center" style="border-style: none none solid solid; background: #e3e3e3"|Location
| align="center" style="border-style: none none solid solid; background: #e3e3e3"|Notes
|-align=center
|Win
|
|align=left| Rene Dettweiler
|MD
|8
|30/08/2008
|align=left| Max-Schmeling-Halle, Prenzlauer Berg, Berlin
|align=left|
|-
|Loss
|
|align=left| Timo Hoffmann
|UD
|10
|04/11/2006
|align=left| RWE Rhein-Ruhr Sporthalle, Muelheim, North Rhine-Westphalia
|align=left|
|-
|Loss
|
|align=left| Paolo Vidoz
|UD
|12
|28/01/2006
|align=left| Tempodrom, Kreuzberg, Berlin
|align=left|
|-
|Win
|
|align=left| Chris Lewallen
|KO
|1
|01/10/2005
|align=left| EWE Arena, Oldenburg, Lower Saxony
|align=left|
|-
|Win
|
|align=left| Marcus Rhode
|TKO
|2
|16/07/2005
|align=left| Nuremberg Arena, Nuremberg, Bavaria
|align=left|
|-
|Loss
|
|align=left| Michael Sprott
|SD
|10
|23/04/2005
|align=left| Westfalenhallen, Dortmund, North Rhine-Westphalia
|align=left|
|-
|Win
|
|align=left| Marcelo Fabian Dominguez
|UD
|8
|18/12/2004
|align=left| Oberfrankenhalle, Bayreuth, Bavaria
|align=left|
|-
|Win
|
|align=left| Cerrone Fox
|TKO
|7
|23/10/2004
|align=left| Tempodrom, Kreuzberg, Berlin
|align=left|
|-
|Win
|
|align=left| Terry McGroom
|UD
|6
|24/07/2004
|align=left| Brandenburg Halle, Frankfurt, Brandenburg
|align=left|
|-
|Win
|
|align=left| Ramon Hayes
|UD
|8
|17/04/2004
|align=left| Max-Schmeling-Halle, Prenzlauer Berg, Berlin
|align=left|
|-
|Win
|
|align=left| Jeff "Big Diesel" Ford
|KO
|3
|28/02/2004
|align=left| Mehrzweckhalle, Dresden, Saxony
|align=left|
|-
|Win
|
|align=left| Marcel Zeller
|UD
|6
|22/11/2003
|align=left| Erdgas Arena, Riesa, Saxony
|align=left|
|-
|Win
|
|align=left| Thomas "Top Dawg" Williams
|TKO
|3
|15/03/2003
|align=left| Max-Schmeling-Halle, Prenzlauer Berg, Berlin
|align=left|
|-
|Win
|
|align=left| Wade Lewis
|KO
|4
|01/02/2003
|align=left| Eissportzentrum Chemnitz, Chemnitz, Saxony
|align=left|
|-
|Win
|
|align=left| Thierry Guezouli
|UD
|6
|16/11/2002
|align=left| Nuremberg Arena, Nuremberg, Bavaria
|align=left|
|-
|Win
|
|align=left| Hein van Bosch
|TKO
|5
|28/09/2002
|align=left| Stadthalle, Zwickau, Saxony
|align=left|
|-
|Win
|
|align=left| Dirk Wallyn
|TKO
|2
|24/08/2002
|align=left| Arena Leipzig, Leipzig, Saxony
|align=left|
|-
|Win
|
|align=left| Istvan Kecskes
|TKO
|2
|01/06/2002
|align=left| Nuremberg Arena, Nuremberg, Bavaria
|align=left|
|-
|Win
|
|align=left| Marco Heinichen
|KO
|1
|27/04/2002
|align=left| Saxony Arena, Riesa, Saxony
|align=left|
|-
|Win
|
|align=left| Roman Bugaj
|SD
|6
|16/03/2002
|align=left| Bordelandhalle, Magdeburg, Saxony-Anhalt
|align=left|
|-
|Win
|
|align=left| Peter Boldan
|KO
|1
|01/12/2001
|align=left| Westfalenhallen, Dortmund, North Rhine-Westphalia
|align=left|
|-
|Win
|
|align=left| George Chamberlain
|TKO
|2
|01/09/2001
|align=left| Bordelandhalle, Magdeburg, Saxony-Anhalt
|align=left|
|-
|Win
|
|align=left| Anthony Abrams
|KO
|2
|09/06/2001
|align=left| Nuremberg Arena, Nuremberg, Bavaria
|align=left|
|-
|Win
|
|align=left| Darrell Morgan
|UD
|4
|21/04/2001
|align=left| Messehalle, Erfurt, Thuringia
|align=left|
|-
|Win
|
|align=left| Ergin Solmaz
|TKO
|2
|24/03/2001
|align=left| Bordelandhalle, Magdeburg, Saxony-Anhalt
|align=left|
|-
|Win
|
|align=left| Nigel Rafferty
|PTS
|4
|17/02/2001
|align=left| York Hall, Bethnal Green, London
|align=left|
|-
|Win
|
|align=left| James Sealey
|KO
|1
|27/01/2001
|align=left| Saxony Arena, Riesa, Saxony
|align=left|
|}

References

External links
 

1977 births
Living people
German male kickboxers
German people of Turkish descent
German male boxers
Olympic boxers of Germany
Boxers at the 2000 Summer Olympics
People from Gronau, North Rhine-Westphalia
Sportspeople from Münster (region)
Super-heavyweight boxers